Maya Romanoff (born Richard Romanoff; June 30, 1941 – January 15, 2014) was an American artist, inventor, and director of the Maya Romanoff Corporation, a manufacturer of wall covering and surfacing materials.

Biography
Romanoff grew up in Lincoln Park, Chicago neighborhood. he was a student at the University of California, Berkeley during the 1960s. After graduation, he traveled to North Africa and Paris, where employment at the couture houses spurred his interest in textile design. The influence of Woodstock led to Romanoff producing fabrics that brought the technique of tie-dye into the realm of couture.

The Maya Romanoff Corporation was established in 1969 and now has more than 60 employees. It is based in Skokie, Illinois.

Diagnosed with Parkinson's disease in 1991, Romanoff continued to lead the company in partnership with his wife Joyce and family. He died on January 15, 2014, aged 72.

Selected works

He led the corporation into position as a prime surface coverings resource for top interior designers and architects. Installations include such high-profile projects as Nobu in Hong Kong, Melbourne and Los Angeles (opened September 2007), the Green Room at the Kodak Theatre for the 2007 Academy Awards, Tiffany & Co, the new Playboy Club in Los Angeles, Boucheron stores, Phantom of the Opera Theater in Los Angeles, special projects for Walt Disney, the palace of the Crown Prince of Dubai, Harrod's, American Girl Stores, etc.

Awards
Romanoff received many awards, including the ICON of Industry Scholarship Award, presented in honor of his lifetime achievements in November 2006 by NEWH, Inc., the Hospitality Industry Network.  Other prestigious awards include House & Garden's Designers' Best, The International Furnishings and Design Association’s Trailblazer Award, Hospitality Design’s Best of Show in Hong Kong, Las Vegas and Miami, commissions for one of a kind artworks with Dizine for the St. Louis Contemporary Art Museum & Puerto Rican Museum of Modern Art, Metropolitan Home's Top 100 Designs, NEOCON’s Best of Show, and the International Contemporary Furniture Fair's Editor's Award.

References

External links
 Official website
 cooperhewitt.org

1941 births
2014 deaths
American interior designers
University of California, Berkeley alumni
Neurological disease deaths in the United States
Deaths from Parkinson's disease
Businesspeople from Chicago
20th-century American businesspeople